Ivan Iliev may refer to:

 Yvan Ylieff (Ivan Iliev, born 1941), Belgian politician
 Ivan Iliev (wrestler) (born 1946), Bulgarian wrestler
 Ivan Iliev (footballer) (born 1955), Bulgarian footballer
 Ivan Iliev (judoka) (born 1985), Bulgarian judoka

See also
 Iliev